"Treatment" is a song by English musician Labrinth. Written by Labrinth, Carl Falk and Rami Yacoub, it was released as the fifth single from his debut album Electronic Earth on 9 September 2012. The album version of the song features vocals from Etta Bond.

Background 
Speaking about "Treatment" in an interview with Digital Spy, Labrinth has stated that "It's a record that, for me, everybody's been through that moment where love sends them a little bit crazy and I thought I needed to write about it".

Music video 
The music video was uploaded to Labrinth's VEVO account on YouTube on 8 August 2012. The video was shot in a black and white perspective and is set in Labrinth's dressing room, showing his emotions of how love sends him crazy.

Track listing

Charts

Release history
Germany
September 7, 2012
(Digital download)
UK
September 7, 2012
(Digital download)

References

Labrinth songs
2012 singles
Song recordings produced by Labrinth
Songs written by Carl Falk
Songs written by Rami Yacoub
2012 songs
Syco Music singles
Songs written by Labrinth